Tishreen University, is a public university located in Latakia, Syria. It is the third-largest university in Syria.

History 
The university was founded under the name of the University of Latakia on 20  May 1971. The name was changed in 1975 to honor the memory of the October War (Tishreen War in Arabic).

In the beginning, the university only had 3 faculties, Arabic literature, science, and agriculture, and an enrollment of 983 students during the 1970s. However, that number has grown to more than 70,000 students, making Tishreen University the third largest in Syria, with the number of its faculties increasing from 3 to 21.

Many internally displaced students enrolled at the university after the outbreak of the Syrian Civil War.

Staff

Academic staff
The academic staff of the University consists of:
 Faculty Members: 892.
 Higher Education Instructors: 24.
 Members of the Technical Staff: 133.
 Teaching Assistants: 598.
 Engineers: 420.

Administrative and laboratory staff
 Laboratory Workers: 240.
 Administrative Employees: 1,119.

Faculties
 Faculty of Arts and Humanities: Opened in 1971.
 Faculty of Agriculture: Opened in 1971.
 Faculty of Science: Opened in 1971.
 Faculty of Civil Engineering: 1972.
 Faculty of Medicine: Opened in 1974.
 Faculty of Mechanical and Electrical Engineering: Opened in 1980.
 Faculty of Dentistry: Opened in 1983.
 Faculty of Architecture: 1984.
 Faculty of Economics: Opened in 1986.
 Faculty of Pharmacy: Opened in 1990.
 Faculty of Nursing: Opened in 1994.
 Faculty of Physical Education: 1995.
 Faculty of Education: Opened in 1997.
 Faculty of Informatics: Opened in 2000.
 Faculty of Technical engineering in 2002.
 Faculty of Information and communication technology engineering: opened in 2008.
 Faculty of Law

Intermediate institutes and vocational schools
 Intermediate Institute of Agriculture: Opened in 1974.
 Intermediate Institute of Engineering: Opened in 1979.
 Intermediate Institute of Medicine: Opened in 1979.
 Intermediate Institute of Commerce: Opened in 1980.
 Intermediate Institute of Administration Skills: Opened in 1995.
 Intermediate Institute of Computer Engineering: Opened in 1998.
 Nursing School: Opened in 1980.

References

External links

Official website

 
Tishreen
1971 establishments in Syria
Tishreen
Buildings and structures in Latakia